"People Are Still Having Sex" is a song written and performed by American musician LaTour. It was released in March 1991 as the first single from his self-titled debut album, LaTour (1991). The song reached number one on both the US and Canadian dance charts. It also peaked at number 35 on the Billboard Hot 100 and number 15 in the United Kingdom.

Content
The song features a monologue expounding the narrator's observations that "people everywhere" are "still having sex"; no matter what authority figures such as parents and counselors advise, and despite the risk posed by AIDS, "nothing seems to stop them". In the album edit of the song, the lyrics were originally written as "This AIDS thing's not working". It was changed to "This safe thing's not working" for radio airplay.

The song is built around an electronica based instrumental dance beat background and also includes LaTour’s spoken word voice speaking various lines. An audio sample of a woman saying "Hello, lover" is taken from the 1987 horror film Evil Dead II.

Critical reception
Larry Flick from Billboard said "People Are Still Having Sex" is "one of the quirkier tunes now breaking out of the Chicago club circuit", noting that "a hypnotic techno beat is topped with a detached male voice reporting the frequency at which folks continue to fornicate." He added, "Industrialists will find "Mark's Missionary Mix" by Mark Picchiotti most useful, while "Mo's Sleazy Mix" by Maurice Joshua will please house enthusiasts." A reviewer from Cashbox said the song "is excellent primer for the rest of the disc." Marisa Fox from Entertainment Weekly commented, "In a dry, radio-announcer tone, LaTour (appropriately, a former producer of commercials) declares over a soundscape of racy rhythms, tinges of electronic melody, and hard-hitting beats that "People Are Still Having Sex"." She added that "this hit song, about the AIDS generation's irrepressible lustfulness, has been causing controversy, mostly because it contained the word AIDS until radio censors had their way."

Music video
The song's music video features early 1990's computer animation, and also features various animated backgrounds, some of which relate to the song's topic, and LaTour's live face is seen at the left and right of the screen during his speaking parts, while animation occupies the rest of the screen. The video was conceived by H-Gun, creator of early videos by Nine Inch Nails and Ministry.

The video of the song was featured on the animated MTV series Beavis and Butt-head, on the episode "Temporary Insanity", which aired on December 10, 1994, and in the Top40 Breakers on the 13 June 1991 broadcast of Top of the Pops, where presenter Jakki Brambles said that LaTour planned a follow-up called People Are Still Having Lunch. LaTour then appeared live in the studio on the 20 June 1991 broadcast of Top of the Pops with various backing artists, as the single climbed up the charts.

In popular culture
The song was used by American figure skater Tonya Harding for her short program in the 1991–1992 season, including at the 1992 Olympic Winter Games in Albertville. The music was one of the only one of her programs to be included in the 2017 film I, Tonya, where the program was recreated by actress Margot Robbie.

Charts

Weekly charts

Year-end charts

Release history

Real McCoy version

In 2007, German rapper Olaf Jeglitza released a cover of the song under the name Real McCoy through his independent label, Phears. The single was produced by Daniel Peter.

Track listing
 CD maxi single
 "People Are Still Having Sex" (radio cut) – 3:19
 "People Are Still Having Sex" (instrumental) – 3:18
 "People Are Still Having Sex" (LaLa's Sunshine Remix) – 6:26

References

1991 singles
1991 songs
2007 singles
Polydor Records singles
Real McCoy (band) songs
Smash Records singles
Songs about HIV/AIDS